Josef "Boban" Šroubek (2 December 1891 – 29 August 1964) was a Czechoslovak ice hockey player who competed in the 1920 Summer Olympics, in the 1924 Winter Olympics, and in the 1928 Winter Olympics. He also played football as a forward for Sparta Prague, and made one appearance for the Czechoslovakia national team in 1921.

He was a member of the Czechoslovak ice hockey team which won the bronze medal in 1920. He scored the lone goal against Sweden in the bronze medal game. He also participated in the 1924 ice hockey tournament and in the 1928 ice hockey tournament. He died in Prague, Czechoslovakia.

References

External links

profile

1891 births
1964 deaths
AC Sparta Prague players
Association football forwards
Czech footballers
Czech ice hockey left wingers
Czechoslovak footballers
Czechoslovak ice hockey forwards
Czechoslovakia international footballers
HC Slavia Praha players
Ice hockey people from Prague
Ice hockey players at the 1920 Summer Olympics
Ice hockey players at the 1924 Winter Olympics
Ice hockey players at the 1928 Winter Olympics
Medalists at the 1920 Summer Olympics
Olympic bronze medalists for Czechoslovakia
Olympic ice hockey players of Czechoslovakia
Olympic medalists in ice hockey
Czechoslovak ice hockey left wingers
Footballers from Prague